Mícheál Breathnach is a Gaelic Athletic Association club based in County Galway, Republic of Ireland. The club is a member of the Galway GAA. Underage teams up to U-16's play in the Galway league and championships while further age groups compete in their respective competitions. Na Breathnaigh compete in the Galway Senior Football Championship yet they have not won the competition in their history.

Na Breathnaigh's Hurling squad represent Ireland in the Iomain Cholmcille shinty/hurling international for Gaelic speakers.  They have defeated the Scots Gaelic team, Alba, twice in 2007 and 2008.  They faced Alba again on 13 February 2010 in Portree but were defeated.

The club is named after Irish-language writer, Mícheál Breathnach, who was connected to the area.

Achievements
 Connacht Junior Club Hurling Championship Winners (1) 2019

Notable players
 Fiontán Ó Curraoin

See also
 Breathnach

References

External links
Homepage of Mícheál Breathnach GAA

Gaelic games clubs in County Galway